Unguided Tour is the sixth studio album by Australian singer-songwriter Stephen Cummings. The album was released in August 1992 and peaked at number 76 on the Australian ARIA Charts.

Reception
Mike Daly from The Age said "Stephen Cummings plays the melancholia game more convincingly than any other Australian singer/songwriter. On Unguided Tour he is at it again, full of recriminations and regrets, addressing lost loves and shadowy memories. But his is a dry-eyed perspective in which, however gloomy the emotional landscape, a flicker of ironic humor illuminates the horizon."

Greg Taylor from Rolling Stone Magazine gave the album 4 out of 5 calling it "One of the best recent outings, any weight, any distance." adding "Unguided Tour sees Cummings returning to a sparser style than his recent, more funkier, albums. The songs range from sardonic views of the world ... and complicated joy, but all the time it is the voice and the impeccable delivery that makes a Stephen Cummings album so special – and Unguided Tour is a very special album"

Track listing

Charts

Release history

References 

1992 albums
Stephen Cummings albums
Polydor Records albums